Žiga Kastrevec (born 25 February 1994) is a Slovenian footballer who plays for Krka. After his football career in Spain, Kastrevec finally left Krka to sign for St. Andrews FC in Malta.

References

External links
PrvaLiga profile 

1994 births
Living people
Sportspeople from Novo Mesto
Slovenian footballers
Association football forwards
Slovenian Second League players
Slovenian PrvaLiga players
NK Krka players
Segunda División B players
Getafe CF B players
Maltese Premier League players
St. Andrews F.C. players
Slovenian expatriate footballers
Slovenian expatriate sportspeople in Spain
Expatriate footballers in Spain
Expatriate footballers in Malta
Slovenia youth international footballers
Slovenia under-21 international footballers